Richard Graham (born 10 May 1960) is an English actor. He played George T.  Rowe in the biopic film Titanic.

He has also appeared in In the Name of the Father (1993), Gangs of New York (2002) and Vera Drake (2004), as well as playing Trevor Clyner in football hooligan films ID (1995) and ID2: Shadwell Army (2016). He appeared in all 12 episodes of Maisie Raine as Mickey Farrel, and in 16 episodes of Hollyoaks as William Alexander. He has also appeared in Inspector Morse and Pie in the Sky. In 2019, he appeared in the BBC soap opera EastEnders as Jonno Highway.

Filmography

Film

Television

References

External links

Living people
1960 births
Male actors from Kent
English male film actors
English male soap opera actors